Ronald Paul Wilson (born in Akrotiri, Cyprus and raised in Singapore and Scotland) is a filmmaker, magician and author. He lives and works between London, Los Angeles, and his home in Scotland.

He was a writer and presenter on the BBC's The Real Hustle from 2006 to 2012.

His film work includes the award-winning short "The Magic Box" and the zero-budget feature "Con Men".

His first full feature, 'Our Magic', is a partly-crowdfunded documentary 'revealing the secret world of magic & magicians as told by the finest thinkers, creators and performers of the art'.

His latest feature film (as writer/director) is "Isolani" (2017), which premiered at the Raindance Festival in London and has since shown at Camerimage, Orlando Film Festival and Sydney Independent Film Festival. It has been nominated as best UK Feature, best leading actress, best cinematography, best director and for the prestigious BIFA Discovery Award at the British Independent Film Festival.

More recently, he has been using his vast knowledge of cons and scams to contribute as a guest author on review site Casino.org and a series on Advantage play techniques on Casinoreviews.net.

References

External links 

 R. Paul Wilson's Conartist site
 R Paul Wilson's Inner Secrets
 BBC Real Hustle Page

Living people
Year of birth missing (living people)
Scottish male television actors